The Brooklyn Academy of Music (BAM) is a performing arts venue in Brooklyn, New York City, known as a center for progressive and avant-garde performance. It presented its first performance in 1861 and began operations in its present location in 1908. The Academy is incorporated as a New York State not-for-profit corporation. It has 501(c)(3) status.

Gina Duncan has served as president since April 2022. David Binder became artistic director in 2019.

History

19th and early 20th centuries
On October 21, 1858, a meeting was held at the Polytechnic Institute to measure support for establishing "a hall adapted to Musical, Literary, Scientific and other occasional purposes, of sufficient size to meet the requirements of our large population and worth in style and appearance of our city." The group applied to the New York Legislature for a charter in the name of Brooklyn Academy of Music. The New York Legislature passed the bill to incorporate the Brooklyn Academy of Music on February 16, 1859. The group raised $60,000 by November 22 and another $90,000 by March 16, 1859. The Brooklyn Academy of Music opened on January 15, 1861.

At the inaugural address on the opening, the management announced that no dramatic performance should ever be held within its walls. The first concert opened with the overture to Der Freischütz, followed by arias and excerpts from various operas, including the William Tell Overture which opened part 2 of the concert.

Founded in 1861, the first BAM facility at 176–194 Montague Street in Brooklyn Heights was conceived as the home of the Philharmonic Society of Brooklyn. The building, designed by architect Leopold Eidlitz, housed a large theater seating 2,109, a smaller concert hall, dressing and chorus rooms, and a vast "baronial" kitchen. BAM presented amateur and professional music and theater productions, including performers such as Ellen Terry, Edwin Booth, and Fritz Kreisler.

After the building burned to the ground on November 30, 1903, plans were made to relocate to a new facility in the then fashionable neighborhood of Fort Greene. The cornerstone was laid at 30 Lafayette Avenue in 1906 and a series of opening events were held in the fall of 1908 culminating in a grand gala evening featuring Geraldine Farrar and Enrico Caruso in a Metropolitan Opera production of Charles Gounod's Faust. The Met presented seasons in Brooklyn, featuring star singers such as Caruso, until 1921.

It was also used for religious services during the early 1900s. Charles Taze Russell, founder of the bible students movement (now Jehovah's Witnesses and International Bible Students Association), gave sermons there the first Sunday of the month from 1908 until 1912.

BAM is adjacent to downtown Brooklyn, near the Long Island Rail Road's Atlantic Terminal, the Barclays Center arena, and the Williamsburgh Savings Bank Tower, once the tallest building in Brooklyn. BAM is part of the Brooklyn Cultural District.

1960s–1999

The Waltann School of Creative Arts (WSCA), founded in 1959, located at 1078 Park Place, Brooklyn, was a BAM venue during the 1960s and 1970s. One of the dance teachers there was African American contemporary dancer Carole Johnson, and the Eleo Pomare Dance Company performed there in 1967.

In 1967, Harvey Lichtenstein was appointed executive director and during his 32 years in that role, BAM experienced a turnaround, attracting audiences with new programming and establishing an endowment. BAM, a multi-venue cultural center, hosts the annual Next Wave Festival in the fall. It began in 1983, and features performances by international and American artists. Its Winter/Spring season of theater, dance, and music is presented from January through June. Humanities, education, and events for children take place throughout the year, plus first-run and repertory films and series. From 1999 to 2015, Karen Brooks Hopkins was president and Joseph V. Melillo was executive producer through 2018. 

The Chelsea Theater Center was in residence from 1967 to 1977.

2000–present
A regular event  was BAMcinemaFest, a festival focusing on independent films. Katy Clark was president from 2015 and left the institution in 2021.

People
Artists who have presented work at BAM include Philip Glass, Trisha Brown, Peter Brook, Pina Bausch, Merce Cunningham, Bill T. Jones/Arnie Zane Company, Laurie Anderson, Lee Breuer, ETHEL, Nusrat Fateh Ali Khan, Steve Reich, Seal, Mark Morris, Robert Wilson, Peter Sellars, BLACKstreet, Ingmar Bergman, Ralph Lemon, Ivo van Hove, and the Mariinsky Theater, directed and conducted by Valery Gergiev, among others.  

Alice in Chains recorded their live album Unplugged at the Academy on April 10, 1996 at the Majestic Theater (now the Harvey Theater) for MTV Unplugged. Alanis Morissette
also recorded her live album MTV Unplugged'' at the Academy on September 18, 1999.

Facilities

The Peter Jay Sharp Building houses the Howard Gilman Opera House and the BAM Rose Cinemas (formerly the Carey Playhouse). It was designed by the firm Herts & Tallant in 1908. It is a U-shaped building with an open court in the center of the lot between two theater wings above the first story. The building has a high base of gray granite with cream colored brick trimmed in terracotta with some marble detail above. It is located within the Fort Greene Historic District. The Howard Gilman Opera House has 2,109 seats and BAM Rose Cinemas, which opened in 1998, comprises four screens, and shows first-run, independent and repertory films and series.

Also within the Peter Jay Sharp Building is the Lepercq Space, originally a ballroom and now a flexible event space which houses the BAMcafé, and the Hillman Attic Studio, a flexible rehearsal/performing space.

The BAM Strong, an array of spaces, includes the 874-seat BAM Harvey Theater at 651 Fulton Street. Formerly known as the Majestic Theater, it was built in 1904 with 1,708 seats and eventually showed vaudeville and then feature films, and was named in Lichtenstein's honor in 1999. A renovation by architect Hugh Hardy left the interior paint faded, with often exposed masonry, giving the theater a unique feel of a "modern ruin". In April 2014, CNN named the BAM Harvey as one of the "15 of the World's Most Spectacular Theaters". Today, the BAM Harvey has become a top choice of venues at BAM among directors and actors for presenting traditional theater. The complex also features a dedicated art gallery.

The BAM Fisher Building, opened in 2012, contains Fishman Space, a 250-seat black box theater, and Fisher Hillman Studio, a flexible rehearsal and performance space, as well as administrative offices. The BAM Hamm Archives are located off-site in Crown Heights at 1000 Dean St. and maintain the publicly accessible Levy Digital Archive.

The BAM Sharp and Fisher Buildings are located within the Brooklyn Academy of Music Historic District created by the New York City Landmarks Preservation Commission in 1978; the BAM Strong is not.

See also
 List of museums and cultural institutions in New York City
 List of concert halls

References

External links

 
 Brooklyn Academy of Music on NYC-ARTS.org
 Brooklyn Academy of Music on NYCkidsARTS.org
 Brooklyn Academy of Music at Google Cultural Institute

1861 establishments in New York (state)
Buildings and structures on the National Register of Historic Places in New York City
Cinemas and movie theaters in New York City
Concert halls in New York City
Culture of Brooklyn
Downtown Brooklyn
Fort Greene, Brooklyn
Entertainment venues in Brooklyn
Event venues on the National Register of Historic Places in New York City
Historic districts in Brooklyn
Leopold Eidlitz buildings
Music venues in Brooklyn
National Register of Historic Places in Brooklyn
New York City designated historic districts
New York City Designated Landmarks in Brooklyn
Performing arts centers in New York City
Special Tony Award recipients
Theatres in Brooklyn
Tourist attractions in Brooklyn
United States National Medal of Arts recipients